The Forks Forum is a weekly newspaper published on Thursdays serving the city of Forks in the U.S. state of Washington.

History 
This newspaper was established in 1931 to serve Forks and the surrounding rural communities of the western Olympic Peninsula. Newspaper publishing on the coast side of the Olympic Peninsula had been underway since 1890.

In 1990, the Forum-Peninsula Herald was sold by Lorraine Maris to Maloney Publishing Co. Maloney also owned the Jimmy Come Lately Gazette in Sequim and the monthly Peninsula Business Journal.

Throughout its history the Forum has been notable as the “Farthest west newspaper in the contiguous United States.”

Sound Publishing, a division of Canada based Black Press Group, purchased The Forks Forum in October 2011 from previous owners Olympic View Publishing Company.

In early 2020, The Forks Forum went entirely digital due to COVID-19 setbacks and returned in May 2020 with a broadsheet format rather than their former tabloid-sized format.

References

External links 
 Official website

Publications established in 1931
Newspapers published in Washington (state)
Clallam County, Washington